Tania Verene Rattray (born 28 March 1958) is an independent member of the Tasmanian Legislative Council (upper house) in the division of McIntyre.

Rattray was educated at Winnaleah Area School and Scottsdale High School. Before becoming a full-time politician, she was an owner/operator of the Winnaleah Four Square Supermarket from 1988–1994. She was also a Senior Pharmacy Assistant at Galloways Pharmacy in Scottsdale from 1994–2004. She was elected to Dorset Council in 1996, becoming deputy mayor in 2002. She stood for election in the Apsley division on 1 May 2004 when her father Colin Rattray retired. She narrowly led on primary votes and was elected after the distribution of preferences.

Rattray was re-elected unopposed in 2010 and was also re-elected in 2016.

References

See also
Members of the Legislative Council

|-

1958 births
Living people
Members of the Tasmanian Legislative Council
Independent members of the Parliament of Tasmania
Tasmanian local councillors
20th-century Australian politicians
21st-century Australian politicians
Women members of the Tasmanian Legislative Council
21st-century Australian women politicians